Jeffrey Kyle Sheppard (born September 29, 1974) is a retired American professional and collegiate basketball player.

Born in Marietta, Georgia, Sheppard was Player of the Year in Georgia in 1993 at McIntosh High School in Peachtree City.

The 6' 3" (1.90 m) University of Kentucky guard (1993–1998), was named Most Outstanding Player in the NCAA tournament in San Antonio in 1998.  He played on two national championship teams at the University of Kentucky under Rick Pitino in 1996 and under Tubby Smith in 1998.

The success of his college basketball career did not carry over to the professional level.  He played briefly in the National Basketball Association with the Atlanta Hawks during the 1998-99 season, averaging 2.2 points and 1.2 rebounds in 18 games. He has since played professionally in Italy with Benetton Treviso (1999-00) (won the Italian Cup), Cordivari Roseto (2000–01) and Würth Roma (2001). He played in the preseason games (but not in any regular season games) for the Toronto Raptors in 2000. He cited the September 11 terrorist attacks as being a factor in his decision to retire from basketball.

Sheppard and his wife, Stacey, née Reed, (herself a former Kentucky basketball player), now live with their two children in London, Kentucky. They are involved with various community activities. Sheppard is also vice president for business development with Wazoo Sports, a regional television sports network concentrating on sports in Kentucky. In 2010, he was involved with a project to restore video and audio of Kentucky's 1958 national championship team.

He is the father of current Kentucky basketball commit, Reed Sheppard.

References

External links
About Jeff Sheppard @ mpcpromotions.com
University of Kentucky stats @ ibiblio.org
NBA stats @ NBA.com

1974 births
Living people
American expatriate basketball people in Italy
American men's basketball players
Atlanta Hawks players
Basketball players from Atlanta
Basketball players from Marietta, Georgia
Kentucky Wildcats men's basketball players
Pallacanestro Treviso players
Pallacanestro Virtus Roma players
Parade High School All-Americans (boys' basketball)
People from London, Kentucky
People from Peachtree City, Georgia
Point guards
Roseto Sharks players
Undrafted National Basketball Association players